Outstanding Comedy Series is a category for the following awards:

Primetime Emmy Award for Outstanding Comedy Series
NAACP Image Award for Outstanding Comedy Series